(French for Liège syrup,  in Flemish) is a Belgian jam or jelly-like spread. Apple and pear are principally used, often with dates: other fruit such as apricot can be used as well. Sugar and other sweeteners are not normally needed.

Cored fruit is cooked slowly until it falls apart, releasing the pectin from the skin. It is then reduced by slow cooking over several hours until the pectin sets, in the same way jam is, then tested by dropping a test piece into cold water. Typically,  of fruit produce  of syrup.

, as its name would suggest, comes from the Liège region of Belgium, which roughly corresponds to the modern Liège Province. Many syrup makers were historically found there, though today syrup makers are primarily concentrated in the Pays de Herve region in the northeast of the province. The largest producer is Meurens in the Aubel municipality, producing two thousand tonnes of it per year under the trademark /. The area is rich in smaller producers including Charlier in Henri-Chapelle, or Delvaux in Horion-Hozémont.

Culinary uses

Its primary use is as a spread, usually on a tartine.

Similar dishes
Apple butter –  could be considered a type of apple butter, though  always includes pears and often includes other fruits as well
Appelstroop – a similar Dutch spread, usually made without pears
Birnenhonig – a similar Swiss spread made of pear juice
Nièr beurre or black butter – a similar Jersey spread made from apples and spices
Vin cuit – a similar Swiss reduction

References

Apple dishes
Jams and jellies
Belgian cuisine
Walloon culture
Liège Province